Todd A. Eachus (born September 26, 1962) is an American politician who served as a member of the Pennsylvania House of Representatives. He represented the 116th District (Luzerne County) from 1997 until 2010. Eachus represented most of lower Luzerne County, including Hazleton, Butler Township, and Foster Township. He previously served as the Majority Leader of the House.

Early life and education 
Eachus was born in Harrisburg, Pennsylvania to Etta May and Sonny Achey. He earned a Bachelor of Arts degree in political science from Pitzer College.

Career 
Responding to the kids for cash scandal in his district in 2009, Eachus sponsored House Bill 1648 which established the Interbranch Commission on Juvenile Justice in July 2009. The commission consists of eleven members, appointed from each branch of government in Pennsylvania, with four members chosen by the judicial branch, four by the legislature and three by the governor.

He was a "key driving force" in shepherding Ed Rendell's healthcare agenda through the Pennsylvania House of Representatives.

Eachus was defeated by Tarah Toohil for re-election in 2010. Toohil resoundly defeated Eachus in again in 2020.

References

External links

Follow the Money - Todd A. Eachus
2006 2004 2002 2000 1998 campaign contributions

1962 births
Living people
Members of the Pennsylvania House of Representatives
Politicians from Harrisburg, Pennsylvania
People from Luzerne County, Pennsylvania
Pitzer College alumni